The Austrian Open is a darts tournament held at Austria and organised by the World Darts Federation. It has been held in Vienna since 2009. First edition of the men's competition took place in 1990. However, the first women's tournament took place in 2003. Tournament have an interruption caused by coronavirus pandemic.

First winners of the tournament was Liam Burke from Germany and Marion Petschenig from Austria.

List of tournaments

Men's

Women's

Boys

Girls

See also
List of BDO ranked tournaments
List of WDF tournaments

References

External links 
 Austrian Open Vienna website
 Vienna Darts Federation (WDV) website
 Austrian Darts Federation (ÖDV) website
 Austrian Open Vienna at Darts Database
 Article at laola1-at

1990 establishments in Austria
Darts tournaments